Melanie Putria Dewita Sari (born 17 April 1982 in Jakarta) is an Indonesian beauty queen, television host and actress. She is known for winning the Puteri Indonesia title in 2002, as the representative of West Sumatra.

Biography
Melanie was born in Jakarta to Habibuddin and Nelwetis. She attended the London School of Public Relation in Jakarta.

Puteri Indonesia 2002
After she was crowned as Puteri Indonesia 2002, she had many social activities.
She also accompanied the Miss Universe 2002, Oxana Fedorova, visiting Borobudur. They also met the President of Indonesia, Megawati Soekarnoputri, at her residence, Istana Negara.

Personal life
She married Angga Puradiredja, a member of Maliq & D'Essentials, in Jakarta on 7 March 2010. They held the wedding reception at Manggala Wana Bhakti and her brother, Andre Habibuddin, acted as her guardian.

She gave birth to a son, Sheemar Rahman Puradiredja, on 27 January 2011.

On November 23, 2018, she filed for divorce from her husband, citing irreconcilable differences. Their divorce was finalized on January 22, 2019.

References

External links 
 Official Puteri Indonesia website
 Indonesian Pageants

1982 births
Indonesian female models
Indonesian television presenters
Living people
Minangkabau people
People from Jakarta
Puteri Indonesia winners
Indonesian women television presenters